The Portuguese International Ladies Amateur Championship is an annual amateur golf tournament in Portugal for women. 

It is an "A" rated tournament in the World Amateur Golf Ranking. The tournament is a qualifying event for the European teams in the Junior Ryder Cup and Junior Solheim Cup, and as such typically features one of the stronger international fields amongst the continental European amateur championships. The 2023 event was the 93nd installment.

Winners

References

External links
FPG - Federação Portuguesa de Golfe

Amateur golf tournaments
Golf tournaments in Portugal